Penestomus is a genus of African araneomorph spiders in the family Penestomidae, and was first described by Eugène Louis Simon in 1902. The genus was formerly included in the family Eresidae, but was elevated to its own family in 2010. It is now considered closer to Zodariidae.

Species
 it contains nine species, found only in Lesotho and South Africa:
Penestomus armatus (Lehtinen, 1967) – South Africa
Penestomus croeseri Dippenaar-Schoeman, 1989 – South Africa
Penestomus egazini Miller, Griswold & Haddad, 2010 – South Africa
Penestomus kruger Miller, Griswold & Haddad, 2010 – South Africa
Penestomus montanus Miller, Griswold & Haddad, 2010 – South Africa, Lesotho
Penestomus planus Simon, 1902 (type) – South Africa
Penestomus prendinii Miller, Griswold & Haddad, 2010 – South Africa
Penestomus stilleri (Dippenaar-Schoeman, 1989) – South Africa
Penestomus zulu Miller, Griswold & Haddad, 2010 – South Africa

See also
 List of Penestomidae species

References

Araneomorphae genera
Penestomidae